Marcus Phillips may refer to:

Marcus Phillips (musician) from America
Marcus Phillips (footballer) of Waitakere United
Marcus Phillips, a 26-year-old African-American man killed leading to Diamond Shamrock and Kwik Stop Boycott protests